In enzymology, an FMN reductase is an enzyme that catalyzes the chemical reaction

FMNH2 + NAD(P)+  FMN + NAD(P)H + H+

The 3 substrates of this enzyme are FMNH2, NAD+, and NADP+, whereas its 4 products are FMN, NADH, NADPH, and H+.

This enzyme belongs to the family of oxidoreductases, specifically those acting on the CH-NH group of donors with NAD+ or NADP+ as acceptor.  The systematic name of this enzyme class is FMNH2:NAD(P)+ oxidoreductase. Other names in common use include NAD(P)H-FMN reductase, NAD(P)H-dependent FMN reductase, NAD(P)H:FMN oxidoreductase, NAD(P)H:flavin oxidoreductase, NAD(P)H2 dehydrogenase (FMN), NAD(P)H2:FMN oxidoreductase, SsuE, riboflavin mononucleotide reductase, flavine mononucleotide reductase, riboflavin mononucleotide (reduced nicotinamide adenine dinucleotide, (phosphate)) reductase, flavin mononucleotide reductase, and riboflavine mononucleotide reductase.

References

 
 
 
 
 
 
 
 

EC 1.5.1
NADPH-dependent enzymes
NADH-dependent enzymes
Enzymes of unknown structure